The 1998–99 Hong Kong First Division League season was the 88th since its establishment. 

The first match was played on 30 August 1998 with Instant-Dict drew South China 2–2. However, as there was an ineligible player in Instant-Dict's squad and the team was penalised with a 0–3 loss.

First stage

Second stage

NB: Teams take points and goals halved from first phase. GF and GA is rounded.

Championship playoff

Relegation playoff

Final

References

Hong Kong First Division League seasons
Hong Kong First Division League, 1998-99
First Division